The City of Dreaming Books (original title: Die Stadt der Träumenden Bücher) is the fourth novel in the Zamonia series written and illustrated by German author Walter Moers, but the third to be translated into English by John Brownjohn. The German version was released in Autumn 2004, and the English version followed in Autumn 2007. It is followed by two sequels, The Labyrinth of Dreaming Books (2011) and The Castle of Dreaming Books (TBA).

Plot
Protagonist Optimus Yarnspinner (Hildegunst von Mythenmetz in the German text) is a Lindworm (a race of bibliophile dinosaurs) who inherits a perfectly written manuscript from his mentor. Its author went to Bookholm, the center of the Zamonian book trade, and was not heard of again.

Seeking adventure as well as inspiration for his own writing, Optimus travels to Bookholm in search of the mysterious author. A publisher directs him to Pfistomefel Smyke, who controls the book trade by means of musical hypnosis. Smyke pretends to help, but then reveals that he hates art and that a truly gifted author would raise the bar and hurt the market for mass-produced fiction. Smyke drugs Optimus and transfers him to the catacombs of Bookholm.

The catacombs are a labyrinth of old, disused shops and storerooms beneath the city. They are inhabited by all kinds of monsters as well as bookhunters, brutish mercenaries who only care for the high prices that rare old books can fetch on the surface. As Optimus tries to navigate the labyrinth, he falls victim to a bookhunter’s trap and almost gets eaten by a spider-like sphinxxx. A bookhunter saves him, only to try and to sell Optimus’ body parts as trophies to fans of lindworm literature. The hunter is killed by an unseen force.

By means of hypnosis, Optimus is guided to the cave of the booklings, a race of one-eyed creatures who live by reading and memorizing books. There he finds some respite, but when the cave is attacked by bookhunters, Optimus has to flee again.

Optimus comes to Shadowhall Castle, home of the Shadow King, a giant who is the mortal enemy of bookhunters. The Shadow King takes a liking to Optimus and tutors him in the art of writing. Eventually he reveals himself to be the mysterious author of the manuscript. Many years ago, he showed his manuscript to Smyke and was transformed into a golem made of an alchemistic paper that is nearly indestructible but will catch fire if exposed to natural light. He was banished to the catacombs and Smyke put a price on his head, leading to the Shadow King’s feud with the bookhunters.

The Shadow King takes Optimus close to the surface where they are ambushed by the bookhunters. The booklings save them by hypnotizing the bookhunters so that they kill themselves. The Shadow King confronts Smyke and kills him, then commits suicide by stepping out into the sun. The resulting fire destroys Bookholm. Optimus flees with a copy of the antique and fearsome Bloody Book and embarks on his own literary career.

Wordplay

The names of many of the authors listed in The City of Dreaming Books are anagrams of famous authors. Below are a few listed in alphabetical order by the last name of the real-world author:

Ojahnn Golgo van Fontheweg = Johann Wolfgang von Goethe
Ergor Banco = Roger Bacon
Lugo Blah (a Zamonian Gagaist) = Hugo Ball (a German Dadaist)
Hornac de Bloaze = Honoré de Balzac
Rashid el Clarebeau = Charles Baudelaire
Bethelzia B. Binngrow = Elizabeth B. Browning
Trebor Snurb = Robert Burns
Selwi Rollcar = Lewis Carroll
Auselm T. Edgecroil = Samuel T. Coleridge
Asdrel Chickens = Charles Dickens
Evsko Dosti = (Fyodor) Fyodor Dostoyevsky
Doylan Cone (Author of Sir Ginel) = Conan Doyle (author, among other works, of Sir Nigel)
Samoth Yarg = Thomas Gray
Dolreich Hirnfiedler = Friedrich Hölderlin
Ugor Vochti = Victor Hugo
Honj Steak = John Keats
Melvin Hermalle = Herman Melville
Gramerta Climelth (Author of Gone with the Tornado) = Margaret Mitchell
Perla la Gadeon = Edgar Allan Poe
Inka Almira Rierre = Rainer Maria Rilke
T. T. Kreischwurst = Kurt Schwitters
Aliesha Wimperslake = William Shakespeare
Elo Slooty = Leo Tolstoy
Rasco Elwid = Oscar Wilde
Wamilli Swordthrow = William Wordsworth
Rimidalv Vokoban (author of "Love and the Generation Gap") = Vladimir Nabokov (author of Lolita, about the paedophilic passion of a middle-aged European professor for the eponymous heroine)
Gofid Letterkerl = Gottfried Keller 
Ertrob Slimu = Robert Musil

The City of Dreaming Books also contains fictional words, found in most of Moers' work. Some are onomatopoeic; others are amalgamations of existing words or Indo-European roots; still others are created by the author. Many such words can be found in Chapter 60. A sample of these are listed below:

"fructodism:" the sensation experienced when squeezing an orange until it becomes soft.
"rumbumblion:" the sound produced by a volcanic eruption.
"indigabluntic:" one of a number of derogatory epithets.
"nasodiscrepant:" a person whose nostrils are notably different in size.
"glunk:" a sound some animals — including lindworms — can make with their teeth, indicating pleasure or satisfaction, particularly with a certain food

Sequels

The Labyrinth of Dreaming Books
A sequel, The Labyrinth of Dreaming Books, has been released, wherein Yarnspinner, now a best-selling author, receives a letter apparently from himself, and visits a rebuilt Bookholm in search of its origin. There, he becomes engrossed in 'Puppetism', the variety of puppet-theatres now ubiquitous in the city, and intrigued by the emulation, among Bookhunters, of Colophonius Regenschein. This second book ends in a cliffhanger, featuring Yarnspinner alone in the still-enormous catacombs, with implication that the 'Shadow King' is alive.

Wordplay
The list of fictional authors, anagramming the names of historical authors, continues or repeats in the sequel, expanded therein to include musicians and artists. These include (but are not limited to):

Orphetu Harnschauer = Arthur Schopenhauer
Nartinian Schneidhasser = Hans Christian Andersen
Plaidy Kurding = Rudyard Kipling
Trebor Sulio Vessenton = Robert Louis Stevenson
Rubert Jashem = James Thurber
Joghan Rimsh = John Grisham
Volkodir Vanabim = Vladimir Nabokov
Wilma Kleballi = William Blake
Eiderich Fischnertz = Friedrich Nietzsche
Odion la Vivanti = Antonio Vivaldi
Perla la Gadeon = Edgar Allan Poe
Evubeth van Goldwine = Ludwig van Beethoven
Freechy Jarfer = Jeffrey Archer
Arlis Worcell = Lewis Carroll
Edd van Murch = Edvard Munch
Crederif Pincho = Frédéric Chopin

Many are identified with their models by reference to the subject of their works.

The Castle of Dreaming Books
A second sequel, The Castle of Dreaming Books, is being written, but as of August 2015, its release date has been indefinitely postponed. It is believed to continue directly from the end of the previous book.

References

2004 German novels
Novels by Walter Moers
German fantasy novels